Way Down East is a 1935 American romantic drama film directed by Henry King and starring Rochelle Hudson, Henry Fonda, Slim Summerville, Margaret Hamilton, Andy Devine and Spring Byington. It was released by 20th Century Fox and produced by Fox Film Corporation.

The picture is a remake of the classic 1920 D. W. Griffith silent film Way Down East starring Lillian Gish, which in turn was based on the 1897 stage play by Lottie Blair Parker.

Plot summary

The story centers upon a starving, impoverished gamin who lost everything after a wicked millionaire tricked her into a marriage and impregnated her. The baby doesn't survive the ordeal and the poor girl ends up sheltered by a puritanical farm family. While there, she falls in love with the son.

Cast
 Rochelle Hudson as Anna Moore
 Henry Fonda as David Bartlett
 Slim Summerville as Constable Seth Holcomb
 Edward Trevor as Lennox Sanderson
 Margaret Hamilton as Martha Perkins
 Russell Simpson as Squire Amasa Bartlett
 Andy Devine as Hi Holler
 Spring Byington as Mrs. Louisa Bartlett
 Astrid Allwyn as Kate
 Sara Haden as Cordelia Peabody
 Al Lydell as Hank Woolwine
 Harry C. Bradley as Mr. Peabody
 Phil La Toska as Abner
 Clem Bevans as Doc Wiggin
 Kay Hammond as Mrs. Emma Stackpole
 Tom London as Choir Singer (uncredited)

References

External links
 Way Down East in the Internet Movie Database
 
 
 

1935 films
1935 romantic drama films
20th Century Fox films
American romantic drama films
American black-and-white films
Remakes of American films
Sound film remakes of silent films
American films based on plays
Films directed by Henry King
Films set in country houses
Films with screenplays by Howard Estabrook
Fox Film films
1930s English-language films
1930s American films
Silent romantic drama films